John Breese Hay (January 8, 1834 – June 29, 1916) was a U.S. Representative from Illinois.

Biography
Born in Belleville, St. Clair County, Illinois, Hay received a limited schooling.
Learned the art of printing.
He studied law.
He was admitted to the bar in 1851 and commenced practice in Belleville, Illinois. He served as prosecuting attorney for the twenty-fourth judicial district of Illinois 1860-1868. He served as delegate to the Republican State convention in 1860.
He served in the Union Army during the Civil War in the 130th Illinois Infantry Regiment.

Hay was elected as a Republican to the Forty-first and Forty-second Congress (March 4, 1869 – March 3, 1873).
He was an unsuccessful candidate for reelection in 1872 to the Forty-third Congress and for election in 1880 to the Forty-seventh Congress.
He resumed the practice of law in Belleville.
Postmaster of Belleville, Illinois from 1881 to 1885.
He served as judge of St. Clair County Court 1886-1900.
He served as mayor of Belleville from 1901 to 1905, when he resigned, having been again elected county judge, and served until 1914.
He died in Winnetka [Chicago], Cook Co., Illinois, on June 29, 1916.
He was interred in Green Mount Cemetery.

References

External links

1834 births
1916 deaths
Union Army personnel
Republican Party members of the United States House of Representatives from Illinois
Illinois state court judges
Mayors of places in Illinois
People from Belleville, Illinois
19th-century American politicians
19th-century American judges